St Paul's Church is in Railway Road, Adlington, Lancashire, England.  It is an active Anglican parish church in the deanery of Chorley, the archdeaconry of Blackburn, and the diocese of Blackburn.  The church is recorded in the National Heritage List for England as a designated Grade II listed building.  It is registered as a parish of the Society under the patronage of St Wilfrid and St Hilda.

History

St Paul's was built in 1883–84 and designed by T. D. Barry and Sons, at a cost of £8,000 (£ in ). The tower was added following the First World War as a memorial to those who lost their lives.

Architecture

Exterior
The church is in Gothic Revival style, incorporating Early English and Decorated features.  It is constructed in yellow stone with red stone dressings; the roof is of Welsh slate, with a crest of red tiles.  The plan consists of a five-bay nave with a clerestory, north and south aisles, north and south transepts, and a chancel.  At the southeast corner is a three-stage tower, containing an entrance porch in the bottom stage.  The tower is supported by angle buttresses, it has paired bell openings and clock faces in the top stage, and a battlemented parapet. There were plans to have a tall spire, but this was never built.  Along the sides of the aisles are single-light windows, with two-light windows in the clerestory.  In the north and south walls of the transepts are two lancet windows with an oval window above.

Interior
Inside the church are five-bay arcades carried on clustered piers with moulded capitals and moulded arches.  The transept and chancel arches are higher but similar.  The roof of the nave is scissor-braced.  In the north transept are stained glass windows by Morris & Co. dated 1895 and 1897, and in the south aisle are two windows of 1953 by A. F. Erridge.  There is a ring of eight bells, all cast by John Taylor & Co; one dates from 1932, one from 1933, and the rest from 1934.

See also

Listed buildings in Adlington, Lancashire

References

Church of England church buildings in Lancashire
Grade II listed churches in Lancashire
Gothic Revival church buildings in England
Gothic Revival architecture in Lancashire
Churches completed in 1884
Diocese of Blackburn
Paul's, Adlington
Adlington, Lancashire